Simi Sernaker, born Simantha Sernaker in 1979 and also known as Simi Stone, is the former frontwoman of the rock bands Suffrajett and The New Pornographers. Sernaker was born and raised in Woodstock, New York, by her mother Dorothy Sernaker and a Jamaican-born father, Ernest Bledsoe, whose mother traveled on the blues circuit playing piano in the south. At seven, Sernaker took up the classical violin and at ten, was admitted to The New York Conservatory for the Arts, where she studied musical theatre, dance, and voice. Upon graduating high school, she moved to New York City and pursued a degree in acting at Marymount College, while she performed in musical theater and off-Broadway plays.

Music career
Sernaker was a founding member of the Afro-punk movement. and formed the band Suffrajett with sideman Jason Chasko. They performed in numerous NYC venues including Bowery Ballroom, CBGBs, and Irving Plaza, and played several Summer Stage events with Joan Jett, The Roots, Erykah Badu, and others. Suffrajett released two records, Suffrajett and Black Glitter on indie labels In Music We Trust and Giant Step Records, which garnered considerable critical acclaim from magazines such as Rolling Stone and Esquire, and earned five stars from The Chicago Sun Times.

Time Out Chicago said of Suffrajett: “This New York via Chicago band has justifiably gained a rep for Detroit style whiplash rock and roll without acting like it’s a low down dirty shame…When she’s not sounding like The Shangri Las' Mary Weiss, she’s summoning the ghost of T-Rex’s Marc Bolan, who knew how to make a whisper sound like a threat.”

In 2009, Sernaker toured as opener for The Duke & the King. They were featured on Jools Holland in London, Saturday with Brendan O’Conner, and 'Canal Plus. Allen Jones from Uncut magazine called her "The sensational Simi Stone" and calls her voice "striking" and her violin "a thing of mournful beauty."

Recording as Simi Stone, Sernaker released a self titled album and a follow-up titled The Rescue'' with musical partner David Baron. Beginning in 2015, she joined The New Pornographers as a touring member before becoming an official member in 2019. Sernaker left the group in 2021.

Art

In 2016, Sernaker  exhibited her visual art at the Ardnaglass gallery in Woodstock, New York.

References

External links

Simi Sernaker at Discogs

1979 births
Living people
African-American rock musicians
African-American Jews
American people of Jamaican descent
American rock musicians
Women rock singers
Singers from New York City
The New Pornographers members
21st-century American violinists
21st-century African-American women singers